Polk Township is a township in Christian County, Missouri. It was named after James Polk, the 11th president of the United States.

References

Townships in Missouri
Townships in Christian County, Missouri